The AMX-30 AuF1 is a French self-propelled gun vehicle currently in use by the armies of France and Saudi Arabia. It replaced the former Mk F3 155mm in French Army service. The AuF1 primary advance is that it incorporates full armor and nuclear-biological-chemical (NBC) protection for its crew of four, while the former Mk F3 155mm offered no protection and could carry only two of its four crew members. The AuF1 saw combat with the Iraqi Army in the Iran–Iraq War.

History
Though the French Mk F3 155mm would remain in production through the 1980s, by the early 1970s the French Army realized there was an urgent need for its replacement. The Mk. 3 155mm lacked a traversable turret and nuclear-biological-chemical (NBC) protection for its crew, and could carry only two of the four crew members needed to operate it (the remaining two having to be transported in support vehicles). Development of the AuF1 began in the late 1960s under the trade name of 155 GCT (155 mm  Grande Cadence de Tir; high rate of fire) and the first production version, known as the AuF1, was introduced during the 1980s. About 400 have been produced, with 70 having been upgraded to the AUF2 variant.

AuF1
The CN 155 AuF1 (Canon de 155 Automoteur Modèle F1, meaning "155 mm self-propelled gun model F1") is based on the AMX-30 main battle tank (MBT) chassis and equipped with a NATO-standard 155mm 39-caliber (L/39) gun with a bustle-mounted autoloader, giving a rate of fire of 8 rounds per minute. It is also equipped with a roof-mounted 12.7mm anti-aircraft gun. The AUF1 has an effective range of 23,000 meters firing conventional rounds and 28,000 meters using Rocket Assisted Projectiles (RAPs).

The first production AMX-30 AuF1s were delivered exclusively to the Saudi Arabian Army, while the French Army received their first deliveries in 1980, deploying the AMX-30 AuF1 in regiments of 18 guns each. In addition, the Iraqi Army received a number of AMX-30 AuF1 variants in 1980, which they employed during the Iran–Iraq War.

Variants and upgrades

 AuF1 "experimental":  pre-production model tested by the French field corps in 1979. They can be recognized by the lack of louver on the right front part of the turret. One of the six was also fitted with a bore evacuator. The six were later upgraded to the H standard.
 AuF1 H: this designation appeared when the AuF1 T was introduced in order to distinguish the two models. The AuF1 H is fitted with a Citroën AZ 5.4 hp auxiliary power unit (APU) mounted under armor.
 AuF1 T: also known as CTI (Conduite de Tir Inertielle; inertial fire control system), it is fitted with an inertial navigation system linked to the main gun fire control system. The Citroën AZ APU is replaced by a Gévaudan micro-gas turbine, the latter required a more curved glacis plate.
 AuF1 TM: also known as T-MODEX (MODule EXpérimental; "experimental module") 24 were made and were used to test the implementation of the ATLAS system. The AuF1 TM were only used by the 40th artillery regiment.
 AuF1 TA: TA stands for Tourelle ATLAS (ATLAS turret), they were built on AMX-30B2 chassis (which featured stronger torsion bar) using the more powerful Renault-Mack E9 diesel engine. As this new engine was taller, a new 12 cm turret ring was fitted in order to raise up the turret. Unlike the previous variants, the AuF1 TM lacks of APU and uses buffer batteries.
 AU F2: proposed upgrade from the 1990s. Increased range (40 km) and rate of fire (10 rnds/min) is accomplished by having a longer L/52 gun as well as an improved autoloader using modular artillery propelling charges.

Operational history
A battery of 8 AuF1s from the French Army's  was deployed in support of the Rapid Reaction Force on Mount Igman during the 1995 NATO bombing campaign in Bosnia and Herzegovina. The battery provided rapid counter-battery fire against Serb artillery units during the siege of Sarajevo, the long range of its guns allowing it to dominate the surrounding terrain.

Operators

Current operators
  – 273 units, 32 in active service in 2020.
  – 18 units
  – 63 units

Former operators
  – 86 received between 1983–1985, kept in storage.

Notes

References

 
 

155 mm artillery
Post–Cold War artillery of France
Tracked self-propelled howitzers
Military vehicles introduced in the 1970s